Hans Edmund Andresen (3 October 1927 – 7 February 2014) was a Danish cyclist. He competed at the 1948 and 1952 Summer Olympics. He also rode in the 1958 Tour de France.

References

External links
 

1927 births
2014 deaths
Danish male cyclists
Olympic cyclists of Denmark
Cyclists at the 1948 Summer Olympics
Cyclists at the 1952 Summer Olympics
People from Rudersdal Municipality
Sportspeople from the Capital Region of Denmark